Wang Haibo (born 7 February 1982) is a Chinese former swimmer who competed in the 2004 Summer Olympics.

References

1982 births
Living people
Chinese male breaststroke swimmers
Swimmers from Zhejiang
Olympic swimmers of China
Swimmers at the 2004 Summer Olympics
Sportspeople from Shaoxing
Asian Games medalists in swimming
Swimmers at the 2002 Asian Games
Swimmers at the 2006 Asian Games
Asian Games bronze medalists for China
Medalists at the 2006 Asian Games
20th-century Chinese people
21st-century Chinese people